Shuzo Kanda (1894 – 5 March 1972) was a Japanese painter. His work was part of the painting event in the art competition at the 1932 Summer Olympics.

References

1894 births
1972 deaths
20th-century Japanese painters
Japanese painters
Olympic competitors in art competitions
People from Hiroshima